Jai Bahadur Singh was an Indian Communist politician. He belonged to Bhumihar community and was an eminent leader and one of the pillars of the Communist Party of India in Uttar Pradesh. He was elected to the 3rd Lok Sabha and 4th Lok Sabha from Ghosi constituency.

References

Indian communists
Communist Party of India politicians from Uttar Pradesh
India MPs 1962–1967
India MPs 1967–1970
Year of birth missing
Lok Sabha members from Uttar Pradesh
Year of birth unknown